This is a list of the best-selling singles in 2001 in Japan, as reported by Oricon.

References

2001 in Japanese music
2001
Oricon
Japanese music-related lists